

Statistics

Statistics by prefecture

Number of cases and deaths

Cummulative 
No. of total confirmed cases

No. of total deaths

No. of total cases by age groups

Daily 
No. of new cases per day

No. of new deaths per day

No. of total active cases per day

Case fatality rate 
The trend of case fatality rate for COVID-19 from 16 January, the day first case in the country was recorded.

References 

COVID-19 pandemic in Japan
Japan